Neil Rushton (born 3 October 1976) is a New Zealand former cricketer. He played five first-class and ten List A matches for Otago between 1999 and 2004.

In 2014 he graduated as a police constable from the Royal New Zealand Police College.

See also
 List of Otago representative cricketers

References

External links
 

1976 births
Living people
New Zealand cricketers
New Zealand police officers
Otago cricketers
Cricketers from Oamaru
People educated at Royal New Zealand Police College